The following lists events that happened during 2014 in Guinea.

Incumbents
President: Alpha Condé
Prime Minister: Mohamed Said Fofana

Events

March
 March 18 - Guinean health officials announced the Ebola outbreak of a mysterious hemorrhagic fever "which strikes like lightning." 35 cases are reported, and at least 23 people died.
 March 23 - The United Nations Children's Fund reports that an outbreak of the deadly Ebola virus that has so far claimed the lives of 59 victims has spread from southern Guinea to the capital Conakry.
 March 24 - An outbreak of Ebola virus which has killed at least 59 people in Guinea continues its spread, entering Liberia and threatens to spread to Sierra Leone.

April
 April 1 - The death toll in Guinea rises to 80 with two people dead in neighbouring Liberia.
 April 4 - The first possible case is reported in Mali, with the death toll rising in Guinea and Liberia to 90.
 April 15 - The death toll from the West Africa Ebola outbreak reaches 121.

June
 June 6 - The World Health Organization estimates that an outbreak of the Ebola virus has killed more than 200 people in West Africa.

July
 July 14 - The Ebola virus outbreak in West Africa continues to get worse with the death toll now exceeding 500.
 July 31 - The World Health Organization announces a US$100 million emergency response plan to combat the outbreak, which has killed at least 729 people.

November
 November 13 - The World Health Organization reports that the death toll in the three worst affected countries in West Africa - Guinea, Liberia and Sierra Leone - has passed 5,000.

References

 
Guinea
Guinea
Years of the 21st century in Guinea
2010s in Guinea